A cigarillo (from Spanish cigarrillo, meaning "cigarette", in turn from cigarro ("cigar") + -illo (diminutive suffix), pronounced  in parts of Latin America or  in Spain) is a short, narrow cigar. Unlike cigarettes, cigarillos are wrapped in tobacco leaves or brown, tobacco-based paper. Cigarillos are smaller than regular cigars but usually larger than cigarettes.  Cigarillos are usually made without filters, and are meant to be smoked like a cigar and not inhaled (except those made in this form only for specific tax issues).

Most cigarillos are machine-made, which is cheaper than hand-rolling. It is unusual to store them in humidors,
partly because they are smoked in large quantities and so have a short shelf-life.

Cheap cigarillos are typically marketed as a brand rather than with the term cigarillo.
In the United Kingdom common consumer brands include Henri Wintermans Signature (formerly Café Creme) and Hamlets and in the rest of Europe Dannemann Moods, Candlelight, Agio Panters and Mehari's, Clubmaster and Handelsgold are popular.
In the United States they include Al Capone, Black & Mild, Backwoods, Dutch Masters, Garcia Y Vega, Game, Splitarillos,  Good Times, Swisher Sweets, and Phillies. Some famous cigar brands, such as Cohiba or Davidoff, also make cigarillos - Cohiba Mini and Davidoff Club Cigarillos.

In Spanish-speaking countries, as well as in the Philippines, cigarrillo means a cigarette.  Anglo-Americans were first introduced to 'cigarrillos' on a massive scale, during their conquest of New Mexico and California during the American-Mexican War 1846-1848.  As it was observed that, "Both sexes smoke cigarrillos almost incessantly."

Taxation

In the United States, cigarillos (and cigars) were taxed at a lower rate than cigarettes.  In February 2009 an increase from 5 cents to 40 cents per pack as part of the SCHIP expansion bill set a tax rate similar to that for cigarettes.

Health concerns
Like other tobacco products, cigarillos are a health risk to those who smoke them. In Brazil, Uruguay, Canada, Australia, India, and throughout Europe they are subject to the same laws which require manufacturers to place a health warning on a portion of each package.

Like cigars, cigarillos are not meant to be inhaled. As a result of this, it is often assumed that cigarillos are a healthier alternative to cigarettes, but health authorities around the world still warn smokers of the risk they pose due to smoke being in the mouth.

See also 
 Beedi
 Cigar
 Cigarette
 Cheroot
 Blunt (cigar)
 Health effects of tobacco
 Smoking culture
 Swisher Sweets

References

Johnston, Abraham, Robinson; Edwards, Marcellus, Ball; Ferguson, Philip, Gooch. (1936) Marching with the Army of the West 1846-1848. Edited by Ralph P. Bieber. The Arthur H. Clark Company, Glendale, California.

Cigars
Tobacciana